Little planet may refer to:
the little planet effect in photography
a level in the video game Sonic the Hedgehog CD